Mount Kaschak is a peak,  high, standing  west of Gambacorta Peak in the southern Neptune Range of the Pensacola Mountains, Antarctica. It was mapped from United States Geological Survey surveys and U.S. Navy air photos from 1956 to 1966, and was named by the Advisory Committee on Antarctic Names for John P. Kaschak, an aviation machinist at Ellsworth Station during the winter of 1958.

References

Mountains of Queen Elizabeth Land
Pensacola Mountains